Plum Valley is a census-designated place (CDP) in Will County, Illinois, United States. It is in the northeast corner of the county, bordered to the north by Cook County and to the east by Lake County, Indiana. To the south is unincorporated Willow Brook Estates. Plum Creek flows from southwest to northeast through the center of the CDP.

Plum Valley was first listed as a CDP prior to the 2020 census.

Demographics

References 

Census-designated places in Will County, Illinois
Census-designated places in Illinois